Erwin Township is a civil township of Gogebic County in the U.S. state of Michigan.  The population was 326 at the 2010 census, down from 357 at the 2000 census.

The township is just south of Ironwood. The Montreal River is the western boundary, with Wisconsin on the other side and to the south. Bessemer Township is on the east and north.

Geography

Demographics
As of the census of 2000, there were 357 people, 146 households, and 104 families residing in the township.  The population density was 7.6 per square mile (2.9/km2).  There were 216 housing units at an average density of 4.6 per square mile (1.8/km2).  The racial makeup of the township was 99.16% White, 0.28% African American, and 0.56% from two or more races.

There were 146 households, out of which 27.4% had children under the age of 18 living with them, 62.3% were married couples living together, 8.2% had a female householder with no husband present, and 28.1% were non-families. 26.0% of all households were made up of individuals, and 6.8% had someone living alone who was 65 years of age or older.  The average household size was 2.45 and the average family size was 2.95.

In the township the population was spread out, with 21.3% under the age of 18, 6.2% from 18 to 24, 28.6% from 25 to 44, 30.5% from 45 to 64, and 13.4% who were 65 years of age or older.  The median age was 43 years. For every 100 females, there were 111.2 males.  For every 100 females age 18 and over, there were 121.3 males.

The median income for a household in the township was $31,071, and the median income for a family was $40,313. Males had a median income of $30,250 versus $22,132 for females. The per capita income for the township was $14,014.  About 6.6% of families and 7.4% of the population were below the poverty line, including 1.0% of those under age 18 and 11.3% of those age 65 or over.

Transportation
CR 505 (Van Buskirk Road) begins at the Ironwood city limits and runs through the township to terminate at CTH-C on the Wisconsin state line in Oma, Wisconsin.

References

Townships in Gogebic County, Michigan
Townships in Michigan
1907 establishments in Michigan
Populated places established in 1907